The Mansion House, Old Warden Park is a 19th-century country house in Bedfordshire, England, designed by Henry Clutton for Joseph Shuttleworth. The house is managed by The Shuttleworth Trust, established in 1944 by Dorothy Clotilda Shuttleworth in memory of her son Richard Ormonde Shuttleworth (1909–1940).

History
The Old Warden estate was bought in the late 17th century by London merchant Sir Samuel Ongley. It passed down in the Ongley family until 1872, when the 3rd Baron Ongley, in financial difficulties, sold it to Joseph Shuttleworth of the Lincoln engineering firm of Clayton & Shuttleworth. It thereafter became better known as the Shuttleworth estate.

The house which stands today was built in 1875–6 for Joseph Shuttleworth by Henry Clutton, the prominent Victorian architect, to rival the 17th-century Shuttleworth mansion at Gawthorpe Hall in Lancashire. Faced with ashlar in the Jacobean style, it is a three-storey rectangular block which replaced an existing house and is a Grade II* listed building.

The house has high chimneys and a 100 ft clock tower. Clutton designed many of the interior features such as the carved doors, balustrades, and chimneypieces. Gillows of Lancaster made many of the interior furnishings and there are several examples of 19th-century paintings by prominent artists such as Sir Frank Dicksee, William Leader, George Vicat Cole and Frank Holl.

During the Second World War, the house was a Red Cross convalescent home and auxiliary hospital for airmen. It then opened as an agricultural college in 1946.

In an adjacent part of the estate, the Swiss Garden is home to 17 listed structures including bridges, the Indian kiosk, and a grotto.

Today 
The house is a venue for weddings, corporate events, product launches, conferences, afternoon tea, and as a filming location for period dramas. It is open to the public on selected event dates, including six Sunday airshows and Flying Proms.

References

External links

Country houses in Bedfordshire
Grade II* listed houses
Grade II* listed buildings in Bedfordshire
Henry Clutton buildings